Itá Ibaté (in Guarani high stone) is a town in Corrientes Province, Argentina. It is located in the General Paz Department.

The town was founded in 1877.

External links

 Itá Ibaté official website

Populated places in Corrientes Province
Populated places established in 1877